Syyryshbashevo (Sıyrışbaş) is a rural locality (a selo) in Chekmagushevsky District, Bashkortostan, Russia. The population was 559 as of 2010. There are 4 streets.

Geography 
Syyryshbashevo is located 14 km northeast of Chekmagush (the district's administrative centre) by road. Tuzlukushevo is the nearest rural locality.

References 

Rural localities in Chekmagushevsky District